Thomas "Tom"/"Tommy" Clarkson (birth unknown – death unknown) was an English professional rugby league footballer who played in the 1910s, 1920s and 1930s. He played at representative level for England, and at club level for Leigh (Heritage № 244), as a goal-kicking , i.e. number 1.

Playing career

International honours
Tom Clarkson won caps for England while at Leigh in 1921 against Australia, in 1922 against Wales, and in 1923 against Wales.

Challenge Cup Final appearances
Tom Clarkson played , and scored 2-goals in Leigh's 13-0 victory over Halifax in the 1920–21 Challenge Cup Final during the 1920–21 season at The Cliff, Broughton on Saturday 30 April 1921, in front of a crowd of 25,000.

Genealogical information
Tom Clarkson was the younger brother of the rugby league footballer; Ellis Clarkson.

References

External links

England national rugby league team players
English rugby league players
Leigh Leopards captains
Leigh Leopards players
Place of death missing
Rugby league fullbacks
Rugby league players from Leigh, Greater Manchester
Year of birth missing
Year of death missing